Conny and Peter Make Music is a 1960 West German musical comedy film directed by Werner Jacobs and starring Cornelia Froboess, Peter Kraus and Gustav Knuth.

It is set in a hotel in Lake Lugano, which is a glacial lake situated on the border between southern Switzerland and Northern Italy. The lake, named after the city of Lugano, is situated between Lake Como and Lago Maggiore.

The film's sets were designed by the art directors Franz Bi and Bruno Monden.

Cast
Cornelia Froboess as Conny
Peter Kraus as Peter
Gustav Knuth as Trautmann
Walter Gross as Maegerli
Gudrun Schmidt as Ingrid Sandberg
Kurt Großkurth as Sulzbach
Karl Lieffen as Grossi
Johanna König as Fräulein Hänchen, Sekretärin
Ralf Wolter as Lehmann, Sulzbachs Assistent
Anne-Marie Kolb as Miss Frankreich
Ilse Corell as Miss Norwegen
Hans Schwarz Jr. as Kriminalbeamter
Trude Herr as Miss Nordsee

References

External links

1960 musical comedy films
German musical comedy films
West German films
Films directed by Werner Jacobs
Constantin Film films
Films with screenplays by Karl Georg Külb
Films set in the Alps
Films set in hotels
Films set in Lombardy
Films set in Switzerland
Lake Lugano
1960s German films